Jumellea fragrans, also known as faham,  is a species of orchid in the genus Jumellea. It is native to the islands of Mauritius and Réunion.

Ecology
It grows as an epiphyte in the lowland rain forest up to 500 m above sea level.

Description
The species blooms in March-April with a single flowered inflorescence with 3 basal bracts.  The flower has a spur of approximately 39 mm long and is pollinated by hawk moths.

Taxonomy

Differentiation from Jumellea rossii
These two similar species can be confused. Jumellea rossii occurs at high altitudes, whereas Jumellea fragrans occurs at lower elevations. Three important diagnostic characters for species delimitation have been identified: The length of the spur, the leaf length, as well as the leaf width:

Phylogeny
Jumellea fragrans is the sister group to Jumellea rossii. It is also closely related to Jumellea tenuibracteata, Jumellea francoisii, and Jumellea alionae, as can be seen in the following cladogram:

Uses
The fragrant leaves and flowers are boiled in hot water to extract its aromatic qualities. This is used to flavour rum on Reunion Island. Other uses that have fallen out of favour include digestive aid, remedy for respiratory disease, ice cream and custards. The plant's use for medicinal purposes on Mauritius is thought to be critically endangered.

Conservation
It is threatened due to unsustainable overcollection in wild habitats and lack of agricultural production. It is recommended to categorize Jumellea fragrans as vulnerable (VU) under the IUCN Red List criteria.

Physiology
Coumarin, and two groups of diterpenes (kaurenes, phytadienes) have been isolated from this species foliage.

References

fragrans
Flora of Mauritius
Flora of Réunion
Orchids of Mauritius
Orchids of Réunion
Epiphytic orchids
Flora of Africa